Hans Pöhl (15 August 1876, Suur-Nõmmküla – 22 January 1930 Tallinn) was an Estonian politician. He was one of the leader of Estonian Swedes.

He was a member of the I, III and IV Riigikogu. From 1918 until 1919, he was Minister of Swedish-minority Affairs.

References

1876 births
1930 deaths
People from Lääne-Nigula Parish
People from Kreis Wiek
Christian People's Party (Estonia) politicians
Swedish People's League in the Baltic Sea Provinces politicians
Government ministers of Estonia
Members of the Estonian Provincial Assembly
Members of the Estonian Constituent Assembly
Members of the Riigikogu, 1920–1923
Members of the Riigikogu, 1926–1929
Members of the Riigikogu, 1929–1932